Mathurin is a French given name that may refer to:

Mathurin (given name), includes a list of people with the name
Mathurin (surname), includes a list of people with the name
Mathurin, an early member of the Trinitarian Order based in the church of Saint-Mathurin in Paris
 Port Mathurin, the capital of the island of Rodrigues

Other